Clarence P. Oakes (June 17, 1900–November 15, 1973) was an American politician who served in the Kansas House of Representatives and Kansas State Senate.

Oakes was born in Merwin, Missouri and his family moved to Kansas when he was five years old. He was elected to the Kansas House in 1938, and served a single term there before being elected to the Kansas Senate in 1940. He resigned his seat in November 1950, and was replaced by Richard L. Becker.

In addition to his time in the state legislature, Oakes served in the U.S. navy, working in military intelligence, and in the U.S. State Department and Central Intelligence Agency. In 1961, he was selected to head the Institute for American Strategy, a defense policy think tank. He led the Institute until his death in 1973.

References

1900 births
1973 deaths
Republican Party Kansas state senators
Republican Party members of the Kansas House of Representatives
20th-century American politicians
People from Independence, Kansas
People from Bates County, Missouri